Fabien Pithia (born 7 May 1987) is a Mauritian footballer who plays for Curepipe Starlight in the Mauritian League as a midfielder.

Career

Senior career
Fabien started off his professional career in 2006 with Savanne SC, and has played with the club ever since.

International career
Fabien earned his first cap for Club M in 2008.

International goals
Scores and results list Mauritius' goal tally first.

Personal
Fabien has a twin brother, Fabrice, who also plays in the Mauritian League for Curepipe Starlight as well as for Club M internationally.

References

External links

Living people
1987 births
Mauritian footballers
Mauritius international footballers
Mauritian twins
Twin sportspeople
Mauritian Premier League players
AS Port-Louis 2000 players
Savanne SC players
Association football midfielders